Oleh Leschynskyi; Oleg Leshchinsky; (born 31 December 1965 in Kiev, Ukrainian SSR) is a former Soviet professional football midfielder and Ukrainian (until 2014) and Russian (since 2014) coach.

Career
After a poor start to the 2012-13 Ukrainian First League season by Tytan Armyansk their coach Oleksandr Haydash was replaced by Leshchynskyi.

Since March to June 2014, Oleg Leshchinsky worked as a manager of Russian side FC Tosno.

References

External links
 Interview at PFC Sevastopol Official Site (Rus)

1965 births
Living people
Footballers from Kyiv
Soviet footballers
Ukrainian footballers
FC Desna Chernihiv players
NK Veres Rivne players
FC Chayka Sevastopol players
Association football midfielders
Ukrainian football managers
Ukrainian Premier League managers
FC Sevastopol managers
FC Tytan Armyansk managers
Ukrainian emigrants to Russia
Naturalised citizens of Russia
FC Tosno managers
FC Okean Kerch managers
FC Sevastopol (Russia) managers
FC Guria Lanchkhuti managers
Russian football managers
Russian expatriate football managers
Expatriate football managers in Georgia (country)
Expatriate football managers in Belarus
Russian expatriate sportspeople in Georgia (country)
Russian expatriate sportspeople in Belarus
Crimean Premier League managers
Ukrainian expatriate football managers